The Majority Says is a Swedish pop rock band. The band was formed in 2010 in Linköping, Sweden. On Valentine's Day 2012 they released their first EP "Best Night Ever". Their song "114" was featured in a large TV advert broadcast in Scandinavia and Eastern Europe for the new Viasat Film channel.
 Their songs have also been used in some American TV series, such as Pretty Little Liars, MTV's Catfish and The Real L Word.

Their first full-length album Under Streetlights was released in October 2012 (only in Scandinavia). In June 2013 the band did a cover of the One Direction song "Little Things" for adverts of the supermarket chain Lidl. In December 2013 The Majority Says released their second EP, "Between Love And Simple Friends" including the song "Run Alone". The song is featured in the German motion picture "Vaterfreuden", starring Matthias Schweighöfer (released in cinemas Feb 6, 2014 Warner Brothers). In January 2014 the band performed at the well known German fashion designer Michael Michalsky's event "StyleNite" during Berlin Fashion Week. They also performed at Laurèl fashion show in July 2014. Their international debut album called "The Majority Says" was released in August 2014 via Warner Music Group. The Majority Says has been supporting act for the German singer-songwriter Philipp Poisel during his summer tour 2014 in Germany and for James Blunt on his three shows in Sweden 2014.

Discography

EP:s
2012: Best Night Ever
2013: Between Love And Simple Friends

Album
2012: Under Streetlights (Scandinavia)
2014: The Majority Says

Singles
2011: Kings Of The Night
2011: Trouble
2012: 114
2013: Where Is The Line
2014: Run alone
2014: Silly Ghost

Members
Hanna Antonsson
Timo Krantz
Jonathan Lennerbrant
Mathias Jonasson

Past members
Mio Negga
Coach Jonsson
Emil Berg

References
Notes

Sources
http://www.musicdealers.com/blog-entry/2012/9/6/music-dealers-placement-showtime-the-real-l-word-tv
http://www.sho.com/sho/the-real-l-word/season/3/episode/9#/index
http://entertainment.stv.tv/music/229231-the-majority-says-are-heading-in-one-direction-with-little-things-cover/
http://www.musicdealers.com/blog-entry/2012/1/17/music-dealers-placement-viasat-campaign
http://www.massive-talent.com/massivetalent-artist/the-majority-says-in-viasat-film
http://www.viasat.se/om-viasat/press#/video/view/viasat-film-reklam-7961
https://web.archive.org/web/20131123184814/http://www.warnermusic.de/the-majority-says
http://music.buddemusic.de/artist/OTg1NC1hODhjZmU/
http://www.c-heads.com/2014/02/07/the-majority-says-releases-new-videorun-alone-raffle-of-1-x-epvinyl-ep-cinema-tickets/
http://www.musikexpress.de/style/article529273/musen-fuer-den-meister-michael-michalsky-hat-lob-und-liebe-fuer-the-majority-says.html

External links 
http://themajoritysays.com/
http://open.spotify.com/artist/0rHFi0qKLbO72s40s0DZ2h
http://www.facebook.com/pages/The-Majority-Says-Official/7084968163?ref=ts

Swedish pop music groups
Musical groups established in 2010
2010 establishments in Sweden